John Lowry Cole (8 June 1813 – 28 November 1882) was an Irish Conservative Party politician in the United Kingdom of Great Britain and Ireland.

He was elected as the Member of Parliament (MP) for Enniskillen at a by-election in 1859 and held the seat until he stood down at the 1868 general election.

Cole was the son of former Fermanagh MP John Cole, 2nd Earl of Enniskillen, and Lady Charlotte Paget, the daughter of Henry Paget, 1st Earl of Uxbridge. His brother Henry Cole was also MP for Enniskillen from 1844 to 1851, and Fermanagh from 1855 to 1880. He died unmarried in 1882.

References

External links
 

1813 births
1882 deaths
Irish Conservative Party MPs
UK MPs 1857–1859
UK MPs 1859–1865
UK MPs 1865–1868
Members of the Parliament of the United Kingdom for County Fermanagh constituencies (1801–1922)
Cole family (Anglo-Irish aristocracy)
Younger sons of earls